Clathrina pulcherrima is a species of calcareous sponge from Australia. It was described by Arthur Dendy in 1891.

References

External links 

Sponges described in 1891
Sponges of Australia